Gilrock Ranch is the first studio album by Night Ranger guitarist Brad Gillis, released in 1993 through Guitar Recordings. The album marks the first recorded work of keyboardist Derek Sherinian.

Track listing

Personnel

Brad Gillis – guitar, bass (tracks 1–3, 6, 7, 9, 10), engineering, mixing, production
Gregg Allman – vocals (tracks 2, 7)
David Bradley – monster vocals (track 4)
Montanna Gillis – baby cry (track 10)
Mark Jellyroll Burkstahler – slide guitar (tracks 2, 10)
Derek Sherinian – keyboard (tracks 1–3, 5, 6, 8–10)
Rodney Freidrich – keyboard (tracks 4, 7)
Carmine Appice – drums (tracks 1, 5, 8)
Kelly Keagy – drums (tracks 2, 4)
Michael Cartellone – drums (tracks 3, 9, 10)
Ronnie Sief – drums (track 6)
T.J. – drums (track 7)
Gary Moon – bass (track 4)
Robin Sylvester – bass (track 5)
Larry Antonino – bass (track 8)
Jennifer Newell – background vocals (track 2)
Paul Carlson – engineering, mixing, production
Toby Wright – engineering, mixing, production
Mark Newman – engineering
Dale Kelly – engineering
John Stix – executive production

References

1993 debut albums